Falls City Sacred Heart Catholic School is a private, Roman Catholic K-12 school in Falls City, Nebraska, United States.  It is located in the Roman Catholic Diocese of Lincoln.

Athletics
Sacred Heart is a member of the Nebraska School Activities Association.  They have won the following NSAA State Championships:

 Boys' eight-man football - 1989, 1990, 1991, 1992, 1993, 1994, 2013, 2016
 Girls' volleyball - 1997, 2006 (runner-up - 1998, 2002), 2021
 Boys' basketball - 1988, 1989, 1990, 1991, 1999, 2001, 2004, 2008, 2018, 2020 (runner-up - 1947, 1974)
 Girls' basketball - 1998, 1999, 2000, 2015, 2017, 2018 (runner-up - 2002, 2003, 2007)
 Boys' track and field - 1990, 1991, 1993, 1994, 1998, 2006, 2014
 Girls' track and field - 1998, 1999, 2000, 2001

References

External links
 http://www.fcsacredheart.org/Pages/default.aspx

Roman Catholic Diocese of Lincoln
Catholic secondary schools in Nebraska
Schools in Richardson County, Nebraska
Private K-12 schools in the United States
Private elementary schools in Nebraska
Private middle schools in Nebraska